Jack Stewart (born May 29, 1983, in Torrance, California) is an American soccer player who last played for Fort Lauderdale Strikers of the North American Soccer League.

Career

High school
Stewart attended South High School Torrance, CA, where he was a standout player voted to All-League and All-CIF awards.

College and Amateur
Stewart played college soccer at the University of Notre Dame, where he was named All-Big East his junior and senior seasons. He also played for Indiana Invaders in the USL Premier Development League.

Professional
Stewart was drafted tenth overall pick in the 2005 MLS SuperDraft by Chicago Fire, but he saw limited action with the team in his rookie season. He was traded to Real Salt Lake on July 25, 2006 in exchange for Ryan Johnson. He was waived by Salt Lake at the end of the 2007 season.

In 2008 Stewart signed with Moss FK of the Norwegian Adeccoligaen, but was released midseason without an appearance. He later moved to Nybergsund IL. On February 13, 2009, he signed with the Carolina RailHawks of the USL First Division.

After a year out of the game in 2010, Stewart returned to the field in 2011 when he signed with the NSC Minnesota Stars in the North American Soccer League. He was loaned to FC Dallas of Major League Soccer on August 15, 2011 for the remainder of the 2011 MLS season.  FC Dallas declined a purchase option at the end of the loan.

Stewart scored his first goal for Dallas in a CONCACAF Champions League group stage match, scoring the match-winning goal in a 1–0 victory over Toronto FC.

On March 6, 2012, Minnesota traded Stewart to Fort Lauderdale Strikers in exchange for Martin Nuñez.

International
Although born in the US, Stewart has trained with the Canadian men's national soccer team due to his ancestry. He has yet to be capped by either nation, and had not formally pledged international commitment to either Canada or the United States.

References

External links
 
 Carolina RailHawks bio

1983 births
Living people
American soccer players
American expatriate soccer players
Soccer players from Torrance, California
North Carolina FC players
Chicago Fire FC players
Expatriate footballers in Norway
FC Dallas players
Fort Lauderdale Strikers players
Indiana Invaders players
Major League Soccer players
Moss FK players
North American Soccer League players
Notre Dame Fighting Irish men's soccer players
Minnesota United FC (2010–2016) players
Nybergsund IL players
Real Salt Lake players
USL First Division players
USL League Two players
Chicago Fire FC draft picks
Association football defenders